Kelly's Ford was a major crossing point on the Rappahannock River. It was the site of a Civil War battle in 1863 and later Stoneman's raid for control of the river ford. Today it is the only crossing on the river between Fredericksburg and Remington. It is the location of the Inn at Kelly's Ford and the Kelly's Ford Equestrian Center. It is also a frequently used launch point for canoe trips down the mostly untouched river.

Rappahannock River